

Introduction 
The Brandeis Hoot, or simply, The Hoot, is the community newspaper serving the Brandeis University campus. Founded in 2005 by Leslie Pazan, Igor Pedan, and Daniel Silverman, it features articles written for, by and about the members of the Brandeis community. The paper's current Editors-in-Chief are Thomas Pickering, Victoria Morrongiello and Madeline Rousell. Doubling in size since its inception, The Hoot is read worldwide and has been cited by national media outlets, including The New York Times, The Boston Globe and NPR. Publishing every Friday during the semester, The Hoot is distributed throughout the Brandeis community. The paper's motto is "To acquire wisdom, one must observe." The Hoot publishes five sections (News, Arts, Opinions [formerly Impressions], Features, and Sports) and an editorial each week.

History 
The Hoot was formed in 2004, when a group of editors at The Justice left because they felt that The Justice was not accurately representing the views of the Brandeis community.

References

External links
 The Brandeis Hoot website

Brandeis University
Student newspapers published in Massachusetts
Newspapers established in 2005
2005 establishments in Massachusetts